The dwarf lizard (Parvilacerta parva) is a species of lizard in the family Lacertidae. It is endemic to Turkey.

References

Parvilacerta
Reptiles described in 1887
Reptiles of Turkey
Endemic fauna of Turkey
Taxa named by George Albert Boulenger